Sherwood College is a co-educational residential school in Nainital, Uttrakhand , India. It was established in 1869 and is affiliated to CISCE and IGCSE.

History
Sherwood was founded on 5 June 1869. It was the brain-child of Dr. Condon, H.S. Reid and others under the patronage of the Rt. Rev. Robert Milman, DD, the seventh Metropolitan of India. The idea took shape as the Nainital Diocesan Boys' High School, as Sherwood was once called. Sherwood's sister school, erstwhile known as Diocesan Girls' High School, branched into All Saints' College, Nainital.

Appeals to the public for funds were overwhelming, and a mixed school under Miss Bradbury was started at Petersfield. Its success was reflected in the large-scale rejection of applications for admission. The direct outcome of this pressure was to separate the girls from boys, the latter shifting to Stoneleigh near the Ramsay Hospital.

According to E. Atkinson's The Himalayan Gazetteer of 1882:
"In 1872 the number of pupils increased to 100, but still many applications were refused in consequence of the want of accommodation: The Committee then appealed to the general public for aid in erecting proper school buildings and met with generous response... In 1873 the Sherwood estate with house and magnificent grounds was purchased by the committee for the boys school and is perhaps the finest site and establishment of its kind in India. The report of the examiners show that both in the internal economy and in the character of the instruction imparted, the Diocesan schools thoroughly fulfill the designs of their founder's."

The school received notice to quit Sherwood so that a new Government House might be built. Accommodation was provided temporarily at Barnsdale near the present-day Secretariat. It was later decided to move the school to the 'health resort' of Khurpatal. Three houses on Alma hill — Tonnochy, Snow View and St. Cloud — served as temporary accommodation.

Land on a spur of Ayarpatta was acquired in 1897 and the foundation stone laid by Alfred, Lord Bishop of Lucknow, on 5 June. From that day, 5 June has been reckoned as Founder's Day.

In 1918 the school was divided into four houses:

In 1922 electricity came to Sherwood, and on 15 June of the same year the infirmary was dedicated and sanctified.

The Horsman brothers, both old Sherwoodians, donated Rs. 75,000/- for the construction of the junior wing known as Horsman Wing, completed in 1927.

In 1937, the name of the school was changed from the Diocesan Boys' School to Sherwood College.

The Binns block was built on the northern side of the back quad; in the following year, Milman Hall was constructed. The new building was formally opened by Sir Harry Haig, Governor of the U.P. It now accommodates a school hall with a seating capacity of 600 and a gymnasium below.

The college chapel, originally dedicated on 1 October 1913, was re-dedicated to St. Barnabas, the Apostle of Learning, on 5 June 1937. A stained-glass window depicting the Good Shepherd was erected on the school's Diamond Jubilee in 1929. The Hammond electric organ was installed in 1939. On Founder's Day, 5 June 1940, a teak altar and altar rails were dedicated to the memory of 'Old Tom' Taylor, a member of the college from 1884 to 1932. The following winter, the wooden paneling of 'shisham' was placed around the chapel and dedicated on Founder's Day 1941. In the same year at the Annual Confirmation Service the teak door was dedicated.

In 1947, the Old Sherwoodians Society had a plaque fabricated bearing the legend 'Sacred to the memory of Old Sherwoodians who made the Supreme Sacrifice in World War II', which lists the names of those who fell in action. Another roll of honour bearing the names of those who were in active service in World War II hangs in Milman Hall.

By 1948, independence had come to India and changes needed to be made. With the exodus of British families, numbers had dropped to a level hardly sufficient to sustain the establishment, but by 1957 the school had approximately 370 boys on its rolls. Additions were made, including an upper floor which was added to the infirmary, and the foundation-stone of the study block (now called Llewelyn Block, the top floor of which has since been demolished to provide an unrestricted view of the plains) was laid. A swimming pool was built.

In 1973, D.R.A. Mountford assumed headship. Between 1973 and 2003 a phased programme of renovation and construction was enacted. The school switched over to the 10+2 pattern under the Indian School Certificate in 1975, when the first batch appeared for the ICSE (class 10) examination. This was the year the last batch of ISC (year 11) appeared for the board examination. The first batch of ISC-12 appeared for the board examination in March 1978.

Two recent innovations have been the introduction of a Computer Literacy program for all students in classes 6 to 12 and the introduction of co-education at class 3 stage onwards.

Motto and colours

The school's motto, in Latin, is Mereat Quisque Palmam, meaning "Let each one merit his prize".

Sherwood was named after the Sherwood Foresters, and the school flag borrowed from their colours: bottle green, maroon and white. The houses are Allen-a-Dale or AD (red), Robin Hood or RH (green), Friar Tuck or FT (blue), and Little John or LJ (yellow), all named after Robin Hood and his Merry Men. Among the recent additions is the purple banner of the girls (Maid Marian).

Campus and activities

The school is on a large, sprawling campus on the Ayarpata hill (one among the seven hills that boundary Nainital Lake). The school is divided into two parts: Dixon Wing (grades 7-12) and Horsman Wing (grades 3-6). There are separate dormitories for the students of both wings. The girls' dormitories are with the new teachers' residences, a little away from the main campus.

It is mandatory for all students to participate in sports and extracurricular cultural activities, such as theatre, music (Indian and Western), fine arts, elocution, debating, and bi-annual group excursions.

The Art Block houses the Indian and Western music departments on the ground floor. The school has its own band. The first floor contains the Art department where the varieties range from crafts like batik and pottery to oil canvas painting. There is a Photography Club, a Hindi Literary Society, an English Literary Society and Senior and Junior Dramatics Societies. On basis of their evaluation in co-curricular activities, the houses are awarded the Co-Curricular Activities Cup at the Founders Prize ceremony.

The chapel (dedicated to Saint Barnabas) is on the front quad (or quadrangle), with views of the Kumaon hills descending into the Terai (the plains).

Principals

Notable alumni

Armed forces

Approximately 300 alumni were on Active Service in World Wars 1 and 2:
   
 Field Marshal S.H.F.J. Manekshaw, Padma Vibhushan, Padma Bhushan, MC, former Chief of the Army Staff
 Air Marshal Subroto Mukerjee, First Indian Chief of Indian Air Force
 General Vishwa Nath Sharma, PVSM, former Chief of the Army Staff
 Vice Admiral Anil Chopra Indian Navy
 Lt Gen Sir Martin Garrod, Commandant General, Royal Marines (UK)
 Lieutenant General Syed Ata Hasnain, Indian Army
 Lt Gen Sami Khan Indian Army
 Major Somnath Sharma  PVC, first recipient of India's highest gallantry award Param Vir Chakra

Performing Arts 
List of film actors:
 Amitabh Bachchan
 Kabir Bedi
 Dalip Tahil
 Nikhil Dwivedi
 Ram Kapoor
 Jameel Khan
 Vivek Mushran
 Vipul Roy a television and film actor
 Anshul Pandey

Other alumni

 Fateh Chand Badhwar, OBE, MBE (Mil.) Indian civil servant, first Chairman Railway Board (India)
 Angad Vir Singh Bajwa, Olympic Shooter, Skeet final round world record holder
 Rattan Chadha, founder and chairman CitizenM, founder Mexx 
 Virendra Dayal, IAS, senior UN official
 Rajeev Dhavan, Senior Advocate, a human rights activist, author, and Commissioner of the International Commission of Jurists
 Ravi S. Dhavan, former Chief Justice of Patna High Court
 Salman Haidar, former Foreign Secretary of India, former Indian high commissioner to the United Kingdom
 Rahul Johri, CEO of Board of Control for Cricket in India (BCCI)
 Cass Mann, AIDS Activist
 Kaleem Omar, Pakistani journalist
 Gyanendra Pandey, former chair of the Department of Anthropology at Johns Hopkins University
 Jitendra Prasada, Indian politician
 Jitin Prasada, Minister of PWD Government of Uttar Pradesh, former Union Minister 
 Ray Whiteside, Australian Olympic field hockey player

References

External links
 
 Old Sherwoodians

High schools and secondary schools in Uttarakhand
Boarding schools in Uttarakhand
Education in Nainital
Educational institutions established in 1869
1869 establishments in India